The Romania national beach soccer team represents Romania in international beach soccer competitions and is controlled by the FRF, the governing body for football in Romania.

Current squad
As of 23 August 2012

Coach: Viorel Farcaș

Achievements
 Euro Beach Soccer League Superfinal fourth place: 2011, 2012
 Euro Beach Soccer League Superfinal sixth place: 2010
 Euro Beach Soccer League Italian Event runner-up: 2011
 Euro Beach Soccer League German Event runner-up: 2012
 Euro Beach Soccer League German Event third place: 2011
 Euro Beach Soccer League Dutch Event third place: 2010
 Euro Beach Soccer League Russian Event third place: 2010

See also 
Romania national football team
Romania national futsal team
Romania national minifootball team

External links
 FRF Profile
 BSWW Profile

European national beach soccer teams
Beach Soccer